Omar Albertto is a Los Angeles-based agent for the fashion industry, specializing in representing ethnically diverse male models. He was the founder of modeling agency, Omar's Men, which had more than a million dollars of revenue its first year of operation (1987), with continued growth throughout the mid-90s. It  included a roster of male models from The Philippines, Turkey, Brazil, Cambodia, among other diverse nationalities. He currently owns and runs, JustOmar, a modeling agency and branding company in Southern California.

In the past three decades, his models have appeared in fashion magazines including;  L'Uomo Vogue, GQ, Arena and Esquire - and have appeared in campaigns for Ralph Lauren, Versace,  Gucci, Armani and Dolce & Gabbana. His models have worked with photographers including Bruce Weber, Mario Testino, Matthew Rolston

Many of his models have segued into successful acting careers, most notably Djimon Honsou, Antonio Sabàto Jr. and Tyrese Gibson, the star of The Fast and the Furious films.

Albertto has also modeled himself, appearing in a Gap advertisement in Times Square, New York, shot by renowned fashion photographer Herb Ritts.

Agent career

Omar's first job as a modeling booker began in 1981 with New York's L'image agency where he worked with a young Paul Fisher (present-day star of Remodeled on The CW). A couple of years later they both moved to California and found work with EastWest Models. Paul represented the girls division and Omar ran the Men's side of the company. After just over a year Paul left the agency to begin his own firm, It Models.

In 1987, Omar left as well and founded Omar's Men joining Fisher (and It Models) in an adjoined complex in Hollywood's Photo District. According to the Los Angeles Times, the two agents combined gross revenue was $15,000,000 annually. The men's department soon outgrew itself and Albertto opened an East Coast hub of the company out of Herb Ritt's studio office in Manhattan. Omar has since headed the Men's Divisions of the agencies, Warning Model Management, Q Models, and Talent Rock Entertainment and was briefly president of ITN Fashion TV.

On multiple occasions Albertto has cast models in large-scale projects (including Vogue and Dolce & Gabbana) for iconic photographer Mario Testino, who was quoted in Business Wire as saying, "Omar's eye is uncanny, he never misses. He never steers me wrong."

With his latest incarnation, the agency JustOmar, he is presenting new faces, artists and photographers such as; designer/model Bryant Brown, model Chris Theo, artist/model Connor Tingley, artist/model David Caffrey, architect/model Jose Laguna and Los Angeles photographer, Josie Perez. He has also launched a division specifically for product branding.

The Producer

In recent years, Omar Albertto has also begun getting more involved in TV and film production. In 2013, he (and Brian Lewis) produced an independent romantic drama film entitled, Things Never Said, for Ohio Street Pictures. The project starred Shanola Hampton, Omari Hardwick and Elimu Nelson and was written/directed by Charles Murray. The picture had a limited theatrical release in the United States and also appeared on Hulu TV.

In 2016, Omar collaborated with fashion photographer Andrew MacPherson to produce one of the first ever fashion magazine shoots involving an autistic model, in this case, 18 year old RJ Peete (son of football player Rodney Peete and actress Holly Robinson Peete. The images (and Omar in person) later appeared on an airing of the program For Peete's Sake on the Oprah Winfrey Network.

Modeling

In 1977, while attending a party at New York's infamous Studio 54 where he was a regular, nineteen year old Omar was discovered by a scout for Elite Model Management. This was an encounter that changed his life drastically. For the next four years, he worked regularly doing print and runway in Paris, Milan and London. All the while, frequently returning to New York to attend Studio 54 on the weekends. Although never officially retiring as a model, Omar began his first official employment as an agent in 1981 at L'image Models on Madison Avenue.

Early life

Omar Albertto who is non-religious of Bermudan and Jewish-Ethiopian descent, grew up in Panama, where he was born. He was a competitive amateur swimmer between the ages of nine and eighteen, representing Panama as a member of the club, Los Pulpos Da Villa. In 1976 he went to Florida's Disney World on vacation and never returned, defecting to the United States. He graduated from Brooklyn's Midwood High School in 1977.

References

External links
 

20th-century American businesspeople
21st-century American businesspeople
American chief executives
1957 births
Living people
Panamanian emigrants to the United States